Charles Edward Capel Martin (21 April 1913 – 19 February 1998) was an auto racing driver from Wales. He was born in Abergavenny, Monmouthshire and died in Chelsea, London.

Early career 

Martin started racing at Southport sands on the Lancashire coast in 1932 moving on to circuit racing driving an MG, also racing in Bugattis and Alfa Romeos at Donington Park and throughout Europe at Pau and Deauville in Grand Prix gaining wins at Brooklands in 1936.

1930s Grand Prix racing driver 
Martin participated in the inaugural Hungarian Grand Prix in 1936, driving an Alfa Romeo.

He lived in Notting Hill, London.

Towards the end of his life he served as the Vice-President of the Brooklands Society.

References 

1913 births
1998 deaths
Welsh racing drivers
Grand Prix drivers
Sportspeople from Abergavenny